Grand Rabbi Moshe Biderman (1776-1851) of Lelów was the 2nd Rebbe of the Lelov Hassidic dynasty.

Biography
Rabbi Moshe Biderman was born into abject poverty in Łachów, Świętokrzyskie Voivodeship, Poland in 1776. His father, Rabbi Dovid Biderman was the founder of the Lelov Hassidic dynasty. After his first wife died, Rabbi Moshe married Rivka Rochel, the daughter of Rabbi Yaakov Yitzchak Rabinowicz.  After the death of his father and his father-in-law, Rabbi Moshe Biderman became a disciple of Rabbi Simcha Bunim of Peshischa. In 1827, upon the death Rabbi Simcha Bunim, Rabbi Biderman became a disciple of Rabbi  Israel Yitzhak Kalish of Vurka. In 1847, Rabbi Kalish died and Rabbi Biderman, finally, agreed to accept a leadership position and became the Rabbi of Przedborz. Shortly before Rabbi Biderman's death, he decided to leave Poland and immigrate to Eretz Yisroel. 72 days after arriving in Jerusalem, he died on December 18, 1851 and was buried on Mount of Olives  near the tomb of the prophet Zacharia.

Notable Disciples
 Rabbi Shlomo Rabinowicz of Radomsk

See also
Lelov

References 

Jewish Polish history
Orthodox Judaism in Poland
1776 births
1851 deaths
People from Włoszczowa County